Visitors to Algeria must obtain a visa from one of the Algerian diplomatic missions, unless they come from one of the visa-exempt countries. All visitors must hold a passport valid for 6 months from the date of entry into Algeria.

Visa policy map

Visa exemption

All passports
The citizens of the following 7 designated countries as well as refugees and stateless persons residing in these countries can enter Algeria for a stay up to a maximum of 3 months:

Diplomatic and service category passports

In addition, holders of diplomatic and/or service category passports of the following countries can visit Algeria without a visa:

Visa waiver agreement for holders of diplomatic and service passports was signed with 

and 

But these are yet to come into force.

eVisa
In February 2020, the Government of Algeria announced a plan to introduce eVisas in the future.

Israel
Entry and transit is refused to  Israeli citizens, even if not leaving the aircraft and proceeding by the same flight.

See also 

Visa requirements for Algerian citizens

References 

Government of Algeria
Foreign relations of Algeria
Algeria